Bernard "Lefty" Kreh (February 26, 1925 – March 14, 2018) was an American fly fisherman, photographer and fly casting instructor who resided most recently in Hunt Valley, Maryland.  Kreh is most known for being one of the pioneers of saltwater fly fishing and his book, Fly Fishing in Salt Water, is considered the seminal volume on the subject.

His wife, Evelyn Kreh, died in November 2011. They had two children, Victoria and Larry, and several grandchildren, Larry's son Larry Jr, and Victoria's children, Matthew (soon to be married to Katherine), Hillary (married to Ronald) and Sammantha (married to Colin), as well as great-grandchildren from Hillary and Ronald, Alexandria, Allyssa, Ryan, Emily, and William.

Early years 
Kreh was born February 26, 1925, in Frederick, Maryland, where he attended Frederick High School. His parents were Theodore (aka "Whitey"), who died in a basketball accident when Kreh was eight; and Helen M. Purdy. His father taught him about fishing, and after he died Lefty would bring fish home for his mother and three siblings, Eileen, Dick and Teddy.

Lefty served in the Battle of The Bulge. He said they barely ate, and always were cold. He was one of the men who helped to take the Ludendorff Bridge from the Germans in the Battle of Remagen. That battle and victory was a turning point in the European theatre for WW2. After serving in World War II, Kreh was one of three US servicemen infected with anthrax, and the only one to survive. The strain he was infected with was named BVK-I as a result.

He began fly-fishing in 1947 while serving as a guide for the famous fly fisherman Joe Brooks.  In 1965 he moved to Miami, Florida, and became the Director of the Metropolitan Fishing Tournament. He wrote for various fishing magazines. He is known throughout to always throw his fish back, keeping the flow in the waters for more fish. He began to fish for saltwater species in the Florida Keys.  It was during this time that Kreh, Joe Brooks, Al Pflueger, Tom McNally, George Hommel, Stu Apte and Bob Stearn's pioneered the techniques, deviating from the classic "Ten to Two" casting technique, that modern saltwater anglers use to pursue fish with fly fishing gear.

Career 
In addition to his fishing accomplishments, Kreh had been an active outdoor writer for more than forty-five years. He wrote for most major outdoor magazines. He was the retired outdoor editor of The Baltimore Sun and held a staff position on several outdoor magazines. Kreh was also an accomplished photographer. On top of all of this, he was part of the TFO rod company and played a key role in the creation of several rods, including the Lefty Kreh series and BVK series (named after the strain of anthrax he survived, BVK-1).

Creation of Lefty's Deceiver 

Lefty's Deceiver is an artificial fly commonly categorized as a streamer fly which is fished under the water's surface. It is a popular and widely used pattern for both predacious freshwater and saltwater game fish. It is generally considered one of the top patterns to have in any fly box.  Kreh invented the Deceiver fly in the late 1950s as a streamer that would be easy to cast in wind and would not "foul" (or wrap around the bend of the hook) a common problem for older streamer patterns.  The original Lefty's Deceiver was tied in as a white pattern, but fly tiers have recreated the pattern in a variety of colors.  A darker colored top with a lighter bottom (mimicking the various forage fishes that larger fishes feed upon) is the most popular design.  The Deceiver is arguably the best-known saltwater fly pattern in the world, and in 1991 the U.S. Postal Service honored Kreh’s creation with a postage stamp.

Instruction  
In 2010, the first "Lefty Kreh Flyfishing Challenge Course" was created as the centerpiece of instruction at HomeWaters University, which is located in Spruce Creek, Pennsylvania. Kreh designed the course himself, incorporating dry land, still water and moving water into various casting stations. He called it a "challenge" course, as opposed to a "casting" course, because he included real-world fly-fishing conditions. Scenarios include the need for long casts, short and precise presentations, casting into the wind, casting with no room for a back cast, and dealing with boulders, rapidly moving water, logs, and other floating debris.
A historical journey of Lefty's instruction can be found in the  Loop Publication (April–July 2017) which is published by Fly Fishers International. The piece is a reflection in Lefty's words about his life teaching and instructing fly casting with an interview by Mac Brown.

Awards and honors 
Kreh received the prestigious "Lifetime Achievement Award" by the American Sportfishing Association, has been honored with the "Lifetime Contribution Award" by the North American Fly Tackle Trade Association, and is also in the Freshwater Fishing Hall of Fame. In 1997 he was named "Angler of the Year" by Fly Rod and Reel Magazine. In 2003 Kreh was inducted to the International Game Fish Association Hall of Fame. Kreh has served a number of years as Senior Advisor to Trout Unlimited, the Federation of Fly Fishers. Lefty was inducted with  Mac Brown in the category of recreation into the  Fly Fishing Museum of Southern Appalachia Hall of Fame in 2018.

Media appearances

Video Games: The iPad games Chuckin' Bugs 101 and Olive the Woolly Bugger pay homage to Kreh. One of the main characters, "Lefty Crayfish", is an anthropomorphized crayfish named after the famous fisherman. Beginning in 2010, Lefty co-hosted the Outdoor Channel fishing show Buccaneers & Bones, along with host/narrator and retired news anchor Tom Brokaw, several other outdoor professionals, and entertainment personalities. The show is shot on location on the coast of Belize and the Bahamas and features the cast teaming up with local guides. The focus of the show is to draw attention to the efforts of The Bonefish and Tarpon Trust, a conservation and research organization dedicated to the preservation of the two warm climate saltwater gamefish species.

Legacy
Much of Lefty Kreh's personal collection of angling memorabilia, tackle, literature, and original fly patterns are held by the American Museum of Fly Fishing in Manchester, Vermont.

Death

Kreh died of congestive heart failure at his home in Cockeysville, Maryland, March 14, 2018.

Bibliography

Sources 
   Biography
  Instructional video on tying Lefty's Deceiver
 Q&A With Fly-Fishing Expert Lefty Kreh
 Q&A with Lefty Kreh
 Lesson in Timelessness by a Fly-Fishing Master
 "The Big Catch: Fly-Fishing Guru 'Lefty' Kreh of Maryland is Still Making a Splash" by Dave Jamieson
 "Q&A With Bernard "Lefty" Kreh" by Samantha Carmichael

References

14. Buccaneers & Bones, Outdoor Channel - http://outdoorchannel.com/showabout.aspx?show-id=741

1925 births
2018 deaths
Angling writers
Fly fishing
Sportspeople from Frederick, Maryland
People from Baltimore County, Maryland
Writers from Maryland
United States Army personnel of World War II